Christian Wagner is an American film editor who has edited films such as Face/Off (1997) and Mission: Impossible 2 (2000). He is also best known collaborating numerous times with film director Tony Scott, from the films True Romance (1993) to Domino (2005).

Filmography

References

External links

Living people
Place of birth missing (living people)
Year of birth missing (living people)
American film editors